Fortitudo Baseball 1953, commonly referred to as Fortitudo Bologna, also known as UnipolSai Bologna for sponsorship reasons, is a baseball club based in Bologna that competes in Serie A1, Italy's professional baseball league.

The team plays at Gianni Falchi Stadium and has won 13 national championships and 6 European Cups.

History
The club was founded in 1953 when the Società Ginnastica Fortitudo (Fortitudo Gimnastics Society) established its baseball section. In 1963, the team merges with ACLI Labor from the baseball Serie A and joins the top level of Italian baseball. That same year, the baseball section becomes autonomous under the presidency of Pietro Leoni and with Jimmy Strong as manager.

Fortitudo Baseball has won thirteen Italian championships in 1969, 1972, 1974, 1978, 1984, 2003, 2005, 2009, 2014, 2016, 2018, 2019 and 2020, and the European Championship six times (1973, 1985, 2010, 2012, 2013, 2019).

In 2013, Fortitudo was the first European team to be invited to participate in the Asia Series, placing sixth overall after losing to Samsung Lions (5–2) and Uni-President 7-Eleven Lions (10–0).

Roster

References

External links 
  Official site

Baseball teams in Italy
Sport in Bologna